Carl Frederick Dolmetsch (1911–1997) CBE  was a French instrumentalist who specialised in the recorder.

The son of Arnold Dolmetsch, he  was born in Fontenay-sous-Bois on 23 August 1911 but lived in England from 1914. After three years in Hampstead he lived in Haslemere for the rest of his life. Dolmetsch was educated at St George's Wood  in Haslemere, before leaving to work alongside his father in the Dolmetsch workshops.

He took part in the first of his father's Haslemere Festival of Early Music, and from then on throughout his life. Dolmetsch developed and improved the production of recorders at Haslemere. He became an accomplished player and  gave his first  recital at Wigmore Hall in 1939.

After the death of his father in 1940 he became head of the firm. During the war it produced plastic aircraft parts, and when peace returned Dolmetsch began producing huge numbers of plastic recorders for use in schools. In 1978 the firm split in two after a boardroom dispute but reunited in 1982. Dolmetsch was also pivotal in getting composers to write pieces for the recorder. He was "the first virtuoso recorder player in England in the twentieth century". He toured annually between 1961 and 1981.

In 1954 he was appointed a CBE. He was elected a fellow at both Trinty College of Music and London College of Music. Dolmetsch was elected Master of the Art Workers' Guild in 1989.

Dolmetsch died on 11 July 1997 and is buried in Shottermill Cemetery.

Commissioned works
Dolmetsch gave his first Wigmore Hall recital in February 1939, with another later that year. A third followed in 1941. Then, from 1948 until 1989, there was an unbroken series of 42 recitals. At each he presented a new work (sometimes two or more) for the recorder. These included: 
 Carl Dolmetsch. Theme and Variations for recorder and harpsichord (1939)
 Lennox Berkeley. Sonatina for treble recorder or flute and piano (1939, repeated 1951)
 Martin Shaw. Sonata in E flat for flute and piano (or recorder and harpsichord) (1941)
 York Bowen. Sonata for treble recorder and piano, Op. 121 (1948)
 Edmund Rubbra. Meditazioni sopra "Coeurs desolés for recorder & harpsichord (1949)
 Herbert Murrill. Sonata for treble recorder and harpsichord (1950)
 Cyril Scott. Aubade for treble recorder and piano (1952)
 Antony Hopkins. Suite for descant (soprano) recorder and piano (1953)
 Norman Fulton. Scottish Suite for treble recorder and piano (1954)
 Edmund Rubbra. Fantasia on a Theme of Machaut, Op. 86. for recorder, string quartet and harpsichord (1955)
 Lennox Berkeley. Concertino, Op. 49, for treble recorder and piano or harpsichord (1956)
 Edmund Rubbra. Cantata Pastorale for high voice, treble recorder, cello and harpsichord or piano, Op. 92 (1957)
 Gordon Jacob. Suite for treble recorder and strings or piano (1958)
 Robert Simpson. Suite for treble recorder and strings (1959)
 Arnold Cooke. Divertimento for alto recorder and strings (1960)
 Georges Migot. Sonatine for recorder (1961)
 Alan Hovhaness. Sextet for recorder, string quartet and harpsichord (1961)
 Edmund Rubbra. Passacaglia sopra (Plusieurs regrets) for treble recorder and harpsichord or piano,, Op. 113 (1962)
 Hans Gál. Concertino for treble recorder and string quartet or piano (1962)
 Gordon Jacob. Variations for treble recorder and harpsichord or piano (1963)
 Ingolf Dahl. Variations on an Air by Couperin for alto recorder or flute and harpsichord or piano (1963 - composed 1956)
 John Gardner. Little Suite in C for treble recorder and piano (1964)
 Arnold Cooke. Sonata for treble recorder, violin, cello, and harpsichord (1965)
 Edmund Rubbra. Sonatina for treble recorder and harpsichord, Op. 128 (1965)
 Nigel Butterley. The White-throated Warbler for sopranino recorder and harpsichord (1966)
 Richard Arnell. Prelude and Variations for recorder and string quartet (1966)
 Hans Gál. Trio-Serenade for treble recorder, violin and cello, Op. 88 (1967)
 John Gardner. Concerto da camera for treble recorder, violin, cello, and harpsichord (1968)
 Joseph Horovitz. Quartetto Concertante for recorder, violin, cello, and harpsichord (1969)
 Francis Chagrin. Preludes for Four, for treble recorder, violin, cello and harpsichord or piano (1970)
 Stephen Dodgson. Warbeck Dances for treble/descant recorder and harpsichord (1971)
 Nicholas Maw. Discourse for treble recorder and harpsichord (1972)
 Walter Bergmann. Song (Pastorella) for soprano and sopranino recorder (1972)
 Martin Dalby. Paginas for recorder and harpsichord (1973)
 Arnold Cooke. Suite for soprano, alto and tenor recorders with or without harpsichord or piano (1973)
 Gordon Jacob. Recorder Quartet, Four Old Tunes (1973)
 William Mathias. Concertino for recorder (or flute), oboe, bassoon and harpsichord or piano (1974)
 Hans Gál. Suite for three recorders and harpsichord (1974)
 Alan Ridout. Sequence for recorder and lute (1975)
 Malcolm Lipkin. Interplay for treble recorder, percussion, viola da gamba and harpsichord (1976) 
 Alun Hoddinott. Italian Suite for treble recorder and guitar, Op. 92 (1977)
 Edmund Rubbra. Fantasia on a Chord, Op. 154, for treble recorder, harpsichord and viola da gamba (1978)
 Lennox Berkeley. Una and the Lion, cantata for soprano, treble recorder, harpsichord and viola da gamba (1979)
 Michael Berkeley. American Suite for recorder and bassoon (1980)
 Alan Ridout. Chamber Concerto for recorder and string quartet (1981)
 Donald Swan. Rhapsody from Within for treble recorder and piano (1982)
 Gordon Jacob. Suite for recorder, violin, cello and harpsichord (1983)
 Colin Hand (1929-2015). Concerto Canticö 5 for recorder and strings (1984)
 Michael Short (b. 1937). Sinfonia for recorder and strings (1985)
 Arnold Cooke. Divertimento for alto/soprano recorder, violin, cello and harpsichord (1986) 
 Lionel Salter. Air and Dance for recorder and piano (1987)
 Jean Françaix.  Quintette for recorder (or flute), 2 violins, cello and harpsichord (1988)
 Alan Ridout. Variations on a Theme by Howells for descant recorder and harpsichord (1989).

References

External links 
 The Dolmetsch Story at dolmetsch online, accessed 2 March 2005
 The Dolmetsch Historical Dance Society, founded 1970 in memory of Mabel Dolmetsch, Carl's mother
 
 1957 film

1911 births
1997 deaths
People from Val-de-Marne
French recorder players
French performers of early music
People from Haslemere
French expatriates in the United Kingdom
Recorders (musical instruments)
Recorder makers
Masters of the Art Worker's Guild
20th-century flautists